Caraga Regional Science High School is a public school in San Juan, Surigao City, Philippines. It is the leading school in the Division of Surigao City with high MPS during the annual National Achievement Tests (NAT), and has been consistent in making its name in Division, Regional, National and International level contests.

History
The birth of the DepEd Caraga Administrative Region or Region XIII on February 23, 1995 by virtue of the Republic Act No. 7901, required the establishment of a Regional Science High School with a permanent site.

Regional Director Sol F. Matugas tasked City Schools Division Superintendent, Dr. Glorina Mongaya-Tremedal, to seek support from former Surigao City Mayor Salvador Sering who agreed with the idea and so donated an area of 10,000 sq.m. located at the portion of Barangay, San Juan.

The Caraga Regional Science High School made Matilde J. Manliguis, appointed by Director Matugas, as head of the school aside from her designation as the principal of the SJNHS.

For the first two years, CRSHS shared the roof of San Juan National High School which is now known as Surigao National High School as it had no building of its own. CRSHS is a sister/brother of SCNHS. The realization of the school building took over a year considering that the location was still swampy. Finally in 1999, it transferred to its new site with a six classroom building with a science and a computer laboratory rooms.

CRSHS started its humble beginning with 120 freshmen qualifiers mostly coming from the elementary schools of the same division and the nearby towns. The number of students gradually decreased yearly until what was left on its fourth year were the 49 students who became the pioneering graduates.

In 2003–2004, DepEd Caraga granted CRSHS the permission to operate a separate secondary school. CRSHS caught the attention of the entire nation when it maintained its place as topnotcher in the National Secondary Achievement Test (NSAT); consequently, putting the school in the Hall of fame.

In S.Y. 2012-2013 the school adapted to the new K-12 Curriculum and pioneers of this curriculum were introduced as "Grade 7 or 7th Graders" these students successfully completed and became the first Junior High School Completers of the school in S.Y. 2015–2016. The first batch of "Grade 11 or 11th Graders" will be introduced in S.Y. 2016 - 2017, The pioneering batch of K-12 Curriculum will graduate Senior High School in S.Y. 2017 - 2018.

In S.Y. 2015-2016 Ms. Ma. Luisa Guyano from Surigao City National High School replaced Mrs. Manliguis as the School Principal after the former principal retired.

Admission and Retention

Admission to Caraga RSHS (Junior High)
Students who belong to the upper 10% of the Grade VI graduating class and who have been recommended by their respective principals are qualified to take the entrance examination.

Selection will be done in three stages and is conducted by the school. The first stage is the administration of standardized mental ability and aptitude test. The student applicant must belong to the 40 percent of the first stage of examination in order to advance to the second stage.

The second stage is the proficiency test in Science, English, and Mathematics. The stage qualifier should obtain at least 75 percent proficiency level in order to advance to the last stage of the selection process.

The last stage is the interview of the student and parents. It would be conducted by the RSHS screening committee. The interview shall be rated in accordance with a prepared rubric and shall be an integral part of the score obtained by the student.

Retention
A student should obtain a final average grade of at least 85% in English, Research, Mathematics and Science, with no grade lower than 80% in any of these subjects, in any grading period, and a final grade of 83% in the rest of the subjects. If a student fails to meet the latter grade requirement the student will be in probation for a period of one year.

There were plans before of increasing the cut-off grade in Science, Research, Math, and English subjects from 85% to 88% and the rest of the subjects from 83% to 85%, however this wasn't implemented due to some circumstances.

Transfer
Only students who have maintained the grade requirement set for RSHS shall be allowed to transfer laterally, that is, from one RSHS to another. Transfer from general high school to the RSHS is not allowed in any curriculum year.

The RSHS Curriculum

Overview
Regional Science High Schools implement a curriculum which is different from Regular High Schools (which uses RBEC curriculum), Science High Schools other than RSHS (which uses ESEP curriculum) in the Philippines and Philippine Science High School (which implements curriculum prescribed by DOST).

The curriculum consists of four levels, which is two years of general studies, followed by two years of a student-chosen major. Students apply for majors in sophomore year, and take four semesters of major classes throughout junior and senior year.

The school offers a highly accelerated curriculum for math, science and information and communications technology and a custom-made curriculum tailored for the school in the areas of the English and Filipino languages, Social Studies, and humanities, with required courses and a wide selection of electives. Students have an opportunity to do independent research, and many compete in the annual Intel Science Fair.

The basic science courses includes earth & environmental sciences, biology, chemistry, and physics. First year students tackle earth & environmental science, and Introduction to Physical Sciences (Physics & Chemistry). Biology, Chemistry and Physics is introduced during second year. Sophomores tackle the areas of botany, inorganic chemistry, and mechanics. Zoology, organic chemistry, and thermodynamics is studied by juniors. Seniors have human biology, analytical chemistry and electricity, electronics, electromagnetics, and vectors.

In mathematics, students takes up elementary mathematics, elementary and intermediate algebra, plane and solid geometry, and probability and statistics during freshman. Linear algebra, analytic geometry, plane and spherical trigonometry, and statistics in research are taken during sophomore. Differential and integral calculus and Differential equations, and Advanced Statistics are learned by juniors. Seniors tackle advanced topics in mathematics.

Students takes a four-year English course. Grammar and composition is tackled by freshmen and sophomores, while journalism, and speech and drama are included in the junior and senior course respectively. Technical writing is also included in the freshmen English course. Philippine literature, Asian literature, World Literature, and Contemporary literature are taught during freshman, sophomore, junior, and senior years, respectively.

Information and communications technology (ICT) is also a part of the curriculum. Freshmen learn about computer fundamentals, digital design, and programming. Sophomores undergo a computer programming and applications course. Digital signal processing is learned by juniors. Data communication and networking is a part of the senior year.

Four years of Filipino language and literatures are required. Sining ng Pakikipagtalastasan (communication arts) courses are studied by freshman and sophomores. Juniors tackle pagbasa at pagsulat sa ibat ibang disciplina (reading and writing in different disciplines) while seniors learn about retorika (rhetoric). Included in their panatikan (literature) course are Ibong Adarna, Florante at Laura, Noli Me Tangere, and El Filibusterismo, which are included during freshman, sophomore, junior, and senior years, respectively.

Social studies and History classes are required. Philippine History, Asian history, World History, and Life of Jose Rizal are taken up by freshmen, sophomores, juniors and seniors, respectively. Sociology, geography, economics, and political science are learned during freshman, sophomore, junior and senior, respectively.

Health and Physical Education courses are also required, with many activities to choose from.

Amendments
In reference to Dep. Ed order No. 25 S. 2006, the following are amendments to enclosure no. 1 of Dep. Ed order no. 49 s. 2003 entitled "The 2003 Curriculum of Regional Science High Schools"

a. Mathematics Curricular offerings effective school year 2006-2007
Mathematics III (elective) - Analytic Geometry
Mathematics IV (core) - Calculus

b. Mathematics Curricular offerings effective school year 2007-2008
Mathematics IV (core) - Error 404: Not Found
Mathematics IV (elective) - Error 404: Not Found

c. Differential equation and Geology/Meteorology/Astronomy as electives in fourth year shall not be offered as electives for high school students.

Caraga Regional Science High School Curriculum

The school is following the new curriculum by the Department of Education, the Enhanced K to 12 Curriculum, as of the school year 2012-2013 and Curricula of English, Science and Mathematics is enriched by additional subjects and electives prescribed in DepEd Order no. 49, s. 2003.

Junior High School Curriculum

Senior High School Curriculum
Caraga Regional Science High School is offering the following strands under the Academic Track of the Senior High School program:

Science, Technology, Engineering, and Mathematics (STEM)

Accountancy, Business, and Management (ABM)

Humanities and Social Sciences (HUMSS)

Student Opportunities

Research
Along with a rigorous academic foundation, and an array of extracurricular choices, students are provided with original research opportunities in the biological and physical sciences, as well as in field of mathematics and programs that hone students' investigation skills and prepare them for academic competitions.

Club Federations and Organizations
Supreme Student Government (SSG) 
Philippine Society of Youth Science Clubs (PSYSC) 
Youth for Environment in School Organization (YES-O)
Information and Communications Technology Club (ICT) 
Mathematics Federated Club 
MAPEH Federated Club
Samahang Filipino 
Historical Society
English Federated Club 
CRSHS Online Board Staff
Clean Environment Advocates League (CEAL) 
National Drug Education Program Club (NDEP) 
Bantay Bilihin Volunteer Network 
Population Development Club (Pop-Dev)
Peer Facilitators' Club 
Boy Scouts of the Philippines (BSP)
Girl Scouts of the Philippines (GSP)
Drum & Lyre Corps
Carascian Performing Arts Ensemble
School Watching Team
School Disaster Risk Reduction and Management Council
Carascian Performing Arts Ensemble (CPAE)
Carascians Camera Crew (CCC)

Publications
The Informer - The official English Publication of Caraga RSHS
Gintong Diwa - The official Filipino Publication of Caraga RSHS

The two publications of Caraga Regional Science High School have been maintaining their spots as one of the multi-awarded school papers in Journalism competitions.

References

External links
 

Regional Science High School Union
Schools in Surigao City
Educational institutions established in 1995
1995 establishments in the Philippines